= 1983 Saga gubernatorial election =

Election for Governor of Saga Prefecture

← 1979	10 April 1983	1987 →
Nominee	Kumao Katsuki	Toshimasa Sekiya
Party	Independent	JCP
Popular vote	380,751	77,588
Governor before election
Kumao Katsuki
Independent
Elected Governor
Kumao Katsuki
Independent

A gubernatorial election was held on 10 April 1983 to elect the Governor of Saga Prefecture. Kumao Katsuki was re-elected.

== Candidates ==
- Kumao Katsuki - incumbent Governor of Saga Prefecture, age 67
- Toshimasa Sekiya (関家敏正, Sekiya Toshimasa), age 48

== Results ==
Saga Gubernational Election 1983
Party	Candidate	Votes	%	±%
Independent	Kumao Katsuki (incumbent)	380,751		
JCP	Toshimasa Sekiya	77,588		
